DeMontie E. Cross (born 1974) is the current director of player personnel for TCU. He was formerly the defensive coordinator of the University of Missouri football team.

Biography
Cross is a graduate of Hazelwood East High School in St. Louis County, Missouri and the University of Missouri. While at Missouri, he played on the football team as a free safety and was named second-team All-Big Eight in 1995 and second-team All-Big 12 in 1996. Cross has two children.

Coaching career
Cross began his college coaching career at his alma mater.  He served as the outside linebackers coach from 1998 to 1999. In 2000, he served as the defensive backfield coach with the Sam Houston State Bearkats. From 2001 to 2005, he was the outside linebackers coach and special teams coordinator of the Iowa State Cyclones. Cross joined the staff of the Buffalo Bills in 2006. He first served as a defensive and special teams assistant before being promoted assistant linebackers coach and special teams coordinator, serving in those positions for three seasons. Cross spent his final season with the Bills as the inside linebackers coach.

In 2016, Cross was selected by new Missouri head coach, Barry Odom, to become the defensive coordinator. Mid-season, Cross was stripped of his play calling duties by Odom.

In 2018, Cross returned to TCU as director of player personnel.

References

1974 births
Living people
Sportspeople from St. Louis County, Missouri
Players of American football from Missouri
American football safeties
Missouri Tigers football players
Coaches of American football from Missouri
Wisconsin Badgers football coaches
Missouri Tigers football coaches
Sam Houston Bearkats football coaches
Iowa State Cyclones football coaches
Buffalo Bills coaches
TCU Horned Frogs football coaches
Kansas Jayhawks football coaches